Guilloume Perez (born July 2, 1957, in Medellín, Antioquia) is a Colombian minimalist artist, self-described master of "Bolismo". His work has been noted by a magazine covering North America's Southwest. He is known primarily for his sculpture and painting.

Background 
Born in Colombia in 1957, he dedicated himself to art at an early age and completed formal studies at Bellas Artes Institute in 1981. In his art, he employs oils, watercolors, oil-pastel, pastel, pencil, ink, and, most recently, sculpture in bronze and stone. Guilloume maintains a studio and fine art gallery in Sandia Park near Santa Fe, New Mexico.

Education 

 Apprenticeship in Fine Art in Bronze, Santa Fe, NM 1993–1995 on Lost Wax Technique 
 Bellas Artes Fine Arts Institute, Medellin, Colombia 1976-1981 - Formal Art Studies

Exhibitions

One-man shows, 1976–2020 

United States
Artistas de Santa Fe (Featured artist), Santa Fe, NM; Desert Art Source, Palm Desert, CA; Naked Horse Gallery, Scottsdale, AZ; Nizhoni Gallery, Albuquerque, NM; Isis On First, Seattle, WA; Jordan Road Gallery, Sedona, AZ; Orchid Gallery, Los Angeles, CA; Camcor Gallery, Los Angeles, CA; Xanadu Gallery, Scottsdale, AZ; Faust Gallery, Santa Fe, NM; Pippin Contemporary, Santa Fe, NM

Colombia
Biblioteca Publica Piloto, Medellin; Ideamos Gallery, Medellin; Turantioquia Gallery, Medellin; Hotel Yuldama, Santa Marta; Gallery Fases, Medellin; Turantioquia Gallery, Medellin; Museo Juan Del Corral- Santa Fe De Antioqvia- One Man Show "Ancestors"

Italy
Biennale International Arte Contemporaneo - Florence, Italy

Dominican Republic
Royal Houses museum, Santo Domingo, Celebrating Abundance One Man Show

Public art and commissions 

"Family Gathering":  Bronze sculpture, 48" high on a steel base, installed at Clemson University, South Carolina. Commissioned by the Clemson Institute on Family and Neighborhood Life in commemoration of its tenth anniversary.

"Just the Two of Us": Bronze 86"H; installed at the Library of the city of Breckenridge, Colorado.

"Aspiration":  Three 36"-high bronze sculptures from an edition of eight purchased by Frank Adams, Chancellor of Cossatot Community College, University of Arkansas.

Books 

 Home of the Artist – 2018
 Emotional Connections – 2014 
 Guilloume's 33 – Sketches, Paintings, Sculptures, Reliefs (1975-2008), 2009
 Forever – Bronze Reliefs, 2008
 Guilloume — Sketches, 2007
 Guilloume — Sculptures and Paintings, 2003

References

External links
 Guilloume Fine Art
 Ones to Watch: Guilloume
 Artists' Studios | Guilloume

20th-century Colombian sculptors
Colombian painters
1957 births
Living people
Modern painters
Modern sculptors
People from Medellín
Colombian emigrants to the United States
Colombian American
American people of Colombian descent
Colombian artists

es:Guilloume Pérez Zapata